Eolo Perfido is a French-born, Italian photographer represented by Sudest57. He specializes in portrait photography and street photography and has been a Leica ambassador since 2013. His work has appeared in publications like The New York Times, Vogue, and GQ among others. He has also shot material for clients including Gatorade, Kraft, and Pepsi along with advertising agencies like Leo Burnett and Saatchi & Saatchi.

Early life and education
Perfido was born in February 1972 in Cognac, France. While in university, Perfido studied computer science and graduated with a degree in the subject. After graduation, he went on to specialize in multimedia development and interactive graphics. In 1998, he moved to Rome to work on software development. Two years later, at age 28, he took up photography. He spent much of his early career as an assistant to photographer Steve McCurry and traveled with him on many assignments throughout the world.

Career
As early as 2006, Perfido's work began appearing in The New York Times. He also opened a photography studio in his garage in Rome which would eventually move into a standalone space. By 2009, his work had appeared in Vogue and GQ and his clients included Gatorade, Pepsi, Saatchi & Saatchi, Novartis, Corbis, and others. In 2011, the Italian magazine, L'espresso, selected Perfido as one of 9 photographers to capture the 150th anniversary of the unification of Italy through photo. In 2013, he was named a Leica ambassador, a title he continues to hold. He also began running international portrait and street photography workshops with the Leica Akademie.

In 2015, a series of Perfido's photos entitled Clownville went viral. The photos, which he began taking as early as 2012, depicted "grotesque" clowns in full makeup and dress. Professional and amateur actors and models were used both in-studio and in-home. Valeria Orlando provided makeup for the subjects. The collection was exhibited throughout the world including at the International Circus Festival in Recife, Brazil.

In 2016, another series of Perfido's photos, Tokyoites, was put on display at the Leica Gallery in Milan, Italy. The photos were taken candidly on the streets of Tokyo, Japan. The following year, Perfido's work was featured in an exhibition entitled 4 Icons at the ONO Contemporary Art Gallery in Bologna. His work was featured alongside three other photography "icons," Steve McCurry, Gian Paolo Barbieri, and Christian Cravo.

In 2019, Perfido founded ExhibartStreet, an online street photography magazine.

Exhibitions 

 2010 - Photo Vernissage - Manege Museum.
 2016 - Tokyoites - Leica Gallery (Milan, Italy)
 2016 - Unrevealed - due piani Gallery (Pordenone, Italy)
 2017 - 4 Icons - ONO Contemporary Art Gallery (Bologna)
 2020 - Interpose - Isolo17 Gallery (Verona, Italy)
 2021 - The Classics, The Creative and the Weirds - ImagOrbetello Photography Festival

Awards and recognition 

In 2009, he received an award from the Association of Italian Photographers for the quality of his photography. The following year he received the prize for best international photographer for his exhibition at the Manege Museum. His street photography earned him the Luce Iblea award in 2019. He also received a bronze medal at the 2021 Cannes Lions International Festival of Creativity for his work on The World Deserves Witness, a campaign with Leica Camera.

References

External links
Official website
Street photography website

1972 births
Italian photographers
Living people